For the results of the Argentina national football team, see:
Argentina national football team results (1902–1919)
Argentina national football team results (1920–1939)
Argentina national football team results (1940–1959)
Argentina national football team results (1960–1979)
Argentina national football team results (1980–1999)
Argentina national football team results (2000–2019)
Argentina national football team results (2020–present)